Lestica is a genus of square-headed wasps in the family Crabronidae. There are at least 40 described species in Lestica.

Species
These 46 species belong to the genus Lestica:

 Lestica alaceris (Bingham, 1896) g
 Lestica alacris (Bingham, 1896) i c g
 Lestica alata (Panzer, 1797) i c g
 Lestica aurantiaca (Kohl, 1915) i c g
 Lestica bibundica Leclercq, 1972 i c g
 Lestica biroi Tsuneki, 1977 i c g
 Lestica camelus (Eversmann, 1849) i c g
 Lestica cinctella (W. Fox, 1895) i c g
 Lestica clypeata (Schreber, 1759) i c g
 Lestica collaris (Matsumura, 1912) i c g
 Lestica combinata Leclercq, 1963 i c g
 Lestica compacta (Kohl, 1915) i c g
 Lestica confluenta (Say, 1837) i c g b
 Lestica consolator Leclercq, 1963 i c g
 Lestica constricta Krombein, 1949 i c g
 Lestica cubensis (Cresson, 1865) i c g
 Lestica dasymera Pate, 1948 i c g
 Lestica eurypus (Kohl, 1898) c g
 Lestica eyurypus (Kohl, 1898) i
 Lestica florkini Leclercq, 1956 i c g
 Lestica formosana Tsuneki, 1977 i c g
 Lestica fulvipes Tsuneki, 1977 i c g
 Lestica hentona Tsuneki, 1990 i c g
 Lestica heros (Kohl, 1915) i c g
 Lestica indonesica Leclercq, 1958 i c g
 Lestica joseana Leclercq, 2006 i c g
 Lestica krombeinii Tsuneki, 1983 i c g
 Lestica lieftincki Leclercq, 1958 i c g
 Lestica luzonia Leclercq, 1963 i c g
 Lestica molucca Leclercq, 1956 i c g
 Lestica okinawana Tsuneki, 1990 i c g
 Lestica plumata Leclercq, 1963 i c g
 Lestica pluschtschevskyi (F. Morawitz, 1891) i c g
 Lestica primitiva Leclercq, 1958 i c g
 Lestica producticollis (Packard, 1866) i c g b
 Lestica pygidialis (Pérez, 1905) i c g
 Lestica quadriceps (Bingham, 1897) i c g
 Lestica reiteri (Kohl, 1915) i c g
 Lestica relicta Leclercq, 1951 i c g
 Lestica rufigaster Tsuneki, 1984 i c g
 Lestica sculpturata (F. Smith, 1873) i c g
 Lestica siblina Leclercq, 1972 i c g
 Lestica subterranea (Fabricius, 1775) i c g
 Lestica sylvatica (Arnold, 1932) i c g
 Lestica tobleri Tsuneki, 1977 i c g
 Lestica wollmanni (Kohl, 1915) i c g

Data sources: i = ITIS, c = Catalogue of Life, g = GBIF, b = Bugguide.net

References

External links

 

Crabronidae
Articles created by Qbugbot